Carl William Demarest (February 27, 1892 – December 28, 1983) was an American character actor, known especially for his roles in screwball comedies by Preston Sturges and for playing Uncle Charley in the sitcom My Three Sons  Demarest, who frequently played crusty but good-hearted roles, was a prolific film and television actor, appearing in over 140 films, beginning in 1926 and ending in the late 1970s. Before his career in motion pictures, he performed in vaudeville for two decades.

Early life
Carl William Demarest was born in Saint Paul, Minnesota, the youngest of three sons of Wilhelmina (née Lindgren) and Samuel Demarest. During William's infancy, the family moved to New Bridge, a hamlet in Bergen County, New Jersey.

Demarest served in the United States Army during World War I.

Career 
Demarest started in show business working in vaudeville, performing initially in his youth with his two older brothers and later with his wife Estelle Collette (real name Esther Zichlin) as "Demarest and Colette". He then moved to work in the "legitimate theatre" on Broadway. Demarest, by 1926 also began working in films, often in productions directed by Preston Sturges and as a member of a "stock" troupe of actors whom Sturges repeatedly cast in his screen projects. He appeared in ten films written by Sturges, eight of which were under his direction, including The Lady Eve, Sullivan's Travels, and The Miracle of Morgan's Creek. Demarest was such a familiar figure at the Paramount studio that just his name was used in the movie Sunset Boulevard as a potential star for William Holden's unsold baseball screenplay.

Demarest appeared with veteran Western film star Roscoe Ates in the 1958 episode "And the Desert Shall Blossom" of CBS's Alfred Hitchcock Presents.

In 1959, Demarest was named the lead actor of the 18-week sitcom Love and Marriage on NBC in the 1959–1960 season. Demarest played William Harris, the owner of a failing music company who refuses to handle popular rock and roll music, which presumably might save the firm from bankruptcy.

He played folksy Jeb Gaine, an occasional sidekick to the main character, in the 1961–62 season of the Western series Tales of Wells Fargo.

Demarest appeared as Police Chief Aloysius of the Santa Rosita Police Department in the film It's a Mad, Mad, Mad, Mad World (1963), as well as in a memorable episode ("What's in the Box") of Rod Serling's The Twilight Zone, portraying a hen-pecked husband who murders his wife.

His most famous television role was in the ABC and then CBS sitcom My Three Sons from 1965 to 1972, playing Uncle Charley O'Casey. He replaced William Frawley, whose failing health had made procuring insurance impossible. Demarest had worked with Fred MacMurray previously in the films Hands Across the Table (1935), Pardon My Past (1945), On Our Merry Way (1948), and The Far Horizons (1955) and was a personal friend of MacMurray.

Awards
Demarest received a single Academy Award nomination for his supporting role in The Jolson Story (1946), playing Al Jolson's fictional mentor. He had previously shared the screen with the real Al Jolson in The Jazz Singer.

Demarest also received an Emmy nomination for the 1968–1969 season of My Three Sons as Best Supporting Actor in a Comedy Role.

Demarest has a star on the Hollywood Walk of Fame for his contributions to motion pictures, bestowed upon him on August 8, 1979, by the Hollywood Chamber of Commerce.  In attendance at the ceremony and then later at Musso & Frank Grill for celebrations were his My Three Sons co-stars Fred MacMurray and his wife June Haver, Tina Cole, Stanley Livingston, Barry Livingston, and Dawn Lyn.

In 1998 a Golden Palm Star on the Palm Springs, California, Walk of Stars was dedicated to him.

Personal life and later years

Demarest was married twice. His first wife was his vaudeville partner Estelle Collette, born Esther Zichlin. Demarest helped raise her daughter, author Phyllis Gordon Demarest, from her earlier marriage, in 1907, to English poet and novelist Samuel Gordon, who had divorced Zichlin before his death. Demarest's second wife was Lucille Thayer, born Lucille Theurer, whom he married in Prescott, Arizona on August 31, 1942. Thayer, who later became an activist on health issues in the motion picture industry, was, in October 1960, appointed California's lay-chairman of the American Nurses Association.

Death
Demarest died at his home in Palm Springs, California on December 28, 1983, and his body was interred at Forest Lawn Memorial Park in Glendale, California.

Partial filmography

Features

 When the Wife's Away (1926)
 Finger Prints (1927) as Cuffs Egan
 Don't Tell the Wife (1927) as Ray Valerian
 The Gay Old Bird (1927) as Mr. Fixit
 Matinee Ladies (1927) as Man-About-Town
 A Million Bid (1927) as George Lamont
 Simple Sis (1927) as Oscar
 The Black Diamond Express (1927) as Fireman
 What Happened to Father? (1927) as Detective Dibbin
 The First Auto (1927) as The Village Cut-Up
 The Bush Leaguer (1927) as John Gilroy
 A Sailor's Sweetheart (1927) as Detective
 The Jazz Singer (1927) as Buster Billings (uncredited)
 A Reno Divorce (1927) as James, the chauffeur
 Sharp Shooters (1928) as 'Hi Jack' Murdock
 A Girl in Every Port (1928) as Man in Bombay (uncredited)
 The Escape (1928) as Trigger Caswell
 Pay as You Enter (1928) as 'Terrible Bill' McGovern
 Five and Ten Cent Annie (1928) as Briggs
 The Butter and Egg Man (1928) as Jack McLure
 The Crash (1928) as Louie
 Seeing Things (1930)
 Fog Over Frisco (1934) as Spike Smith
 Many Happy Returns (1934) as Brinker
 The Circus Clown (1934) (scenes deleted)
 Fugitive Lady (1934) as Steve Rogers
 After Office Hours (1935) as Police Detective (uncredited)
 The Casino Murder Case (1935) as Auctioneer (uncredited)
 The Murder Man (1935) as 'Red' Maguire
 Bright Lights (1935) as Detective
 Diamond Jim (1935) as Harry Hill
 Hands Across the Table (1935) as Natty (uncredited)
 White Lies (1935) as Roberts
 The Great Ziegfeld (1936) as Gene Buck (uncredited)
 Wedding Present (1936) as 'Smiles' Benson
 Love on the Run (1936) as Editor Lees Berger
 Charlie Chan at the Opera (1936) as Sgt. Kelly
 Mind Your Own Business (1936) as Droopy
 Time Out for Romance (1937) as Willoughby Sproggs
 Don't Tell the Wife (1937) as Larry 'Horace' Tucker
 Oh, Doctor (1937) as Marty Short
 The Hit Parade (1937) as Parole Officer
 The Great Hospital Mystery (1937) as Mr. Beatty
 The Great Gambini (1937) as Sergeant Kirby
 Easy Living (1937) as Wallace Whistling
 Blonde Trouble (1937) as Paul Sears
 Wake Up and Live (1937) as Radio Station Attendant
 Big City (1937) as Beecher
 Rosalie (1937) as Army Coach
 Rebecca of Sunnybrook Farm (1938) as Henry Kipper
 Romance on the Run (1938) as Police Lt. Eckhardt
 One Wild Night (1938) as Editor Collins
 Josette (1938) as Joe, Diner Owner
 Peck's Bad Boy with the Circus (1938) as Daro
 While New York Sleeps (1938) as Red Miller
 The Great Man Votes (1939) as Charles Dale
 King of the Turf (1939) as Arnold
 The Gracie Allen Murder Case (1939) as Police Sgt. Ernest Heath
 The Cowboy Quarterback (1939) as Rusty Walker
 Miracles for Sale (1939) as Quinn
 Mr. Smith Goes to Washington (1939) as Bill Griffith
 Laugh It Off (1939) as Barney 'Gimpy' Cole
 Wolf of New York (1940) as Bill Ennis
 The Farmer's Daughter (1940) as Victor Walsh
 The Great McGinty (1940) as Skeeters – The Politician
 Comin' Round the Mountain (1940) as Gutsy Mann
 The Golden Fleecing (1940) as Swallow
 Christmas in July (1940) as Mr. Bildocker
 Little Men (1940) as Constable Tom Thorpe
 The Lady Eve (1941) as Muggsy
 The Devil and Miss Jones (1941) as First Detective
 Rookies on Parade (1941) as Mike Brady
 Ride on Vaquero (1941) as Bartender Barney
 Country Fair (1941) as Stogie McPhee
 Dressed to Kill (1941) as Inspector Pierson
 All Through the Night (1941) as Sunshine
 Sullivan's Travels (1941) as Mr. Jonas
 Glamour Boy (1941) as Papa Doran
 True to the Army (1942) as Sgt. Butts
 My Favorite Spy (1942) as Flower Pot Policeman
 Pardon My Sarong (1942) as Detective Kendall
 The Palm Beach Story (1942) as First Member Ale and Quail Club
 Behind the Eight Ball (1942) as McKenzie
 Life Begins at Eight-Thirty (1942) as Police Officer
 Johnny Doughboy (1942) as Harry Fabian
 Stage Door Canteen (1943) as William Demarest
 Dangerous Blondes (1943) as Detective Gatling
 True to Life (1943) as Uncle Jake
 The Miracle of Morgan's Creek (1944) as Constable Edmund Kockenlocker
 Nine Girls (1944) as Walter Cummings
 Once Upon a Time (1944) as Brandt
 Hail the Conquering Hero (1944) as Sgt. Heffelfinger
 The Great Moment (1944) as Eben Frost
 Salty O'Rourke (1945) as Smitty
 Along Came Jones (1945) as George Fury
 Duffy's Tavern (1945) as HImself
 Pardon My Past (1945) as Chuck Gibson
 Our Hearts Were Growing Up (1946) as Peanuts Schultz
 The Jolson Story (1946) as Steve Martin
 The Perils of Pauline (1947) as George 'Mac' McGuire
 Variety Girl (1947) as Barker
 On Our Merry Way (1948) as Floyd
 The Sainted Sisters (1948) as Vern Tewilliger
 Night Has a Thousand Eyes (1948) as Lieut. Shawn
 Whispering Smith (1948) as Bill Dansing
 Sorrowful Jones (1949) as Regret
 Jolson Sings Again (1949) as Steve Martin
 Red, Hot and Blue (1949) as Charlie Baxter, Press Agent
 When Willie Comes Marching Home (1950) as Herman Kluggs
 Riding High (1950) as Happy
 Never a Dull Moment (1950) as Mears
 He's a Cockeyed Wonder (1950) as Bob Sears
 The First Legion (1951) as Monsignor Michael Carey
 Excuse My Dust (1951) as Harvey Bullitt
 The Strip (1951) as Fluff
 Behave Yourself! (1951) as Officer O'Ryan
 What Price Glory (1952) as Cpl. Kiper
 The Blazing Forest (1952) as Syd Jessup
 The Lady Wants Mink (1953) as Harvey Jones
 Dangerous When Wet (1953) as Pa Higgins
 Here Come the Girls (1953) as Dennis Logan
 Escape from Fort Bravo (1953) as Campbell
 The Yellow Mountain (1954) as Jackpot Wray
 Jupiter's Darling (1955) as Mago
 The Far Horizons (1955) as Sgt. Gass
 The Private War of Major Benson (1955) as John
 Lucy Gallant (1955) as Charles Madden
 Sincerely Yours (1955) as Sam Dunne
 Hell on Frisco Bay (1956) as Dan Bianco
 The Rawhide Years (1956) as Brand Comfort
 The Mountain (1956) as Father Belacchi
 Pepe (1960) as Movie Studio Gateman
 The Big Bankroll (1961) as Henry Hecht
 Twenty Plus Two (1961) as Desmond Slocum
 Son of Flubber (1963) as Mr. Hummel
 It's a Mad, Mad, Mad, Mad World (1963) as Aloysius, Chief of the Santa Rosita Police Department
 Viva Las Vegas (1964) as Mr. Martin
 That Darn Cat (1965) as Mr. MacDougall
 Don't Be Afraid Of The Dark (1973) as Mr. Harris
 The Wild McCullochs (1975) as Father Gurkin
 Won Ton Ton, the Dog Who Saved Hollywood (1976) as Studio Gatekeeper

Short subjects
 A Night at Coffee Dan's (1927) as M.C.
 Amateur Night (1927) as Theatre Manager
 The Night Court (1927) as Defense Counsel (uncredited)
 Seeing Things (1930)
 The Run Around (1932)

Television
 The Danny Thomas Show in 5 episodes (1957–1958) as Mr. Daly
 The Rebel in "The Hope Chest (1960) as Ulysses Bowman
 Love and Marriage (1959–1960) as William Harris
 Tales of Wells Fargo (1961–1962) as Jeb Gaine
 Going My Way in "The Slasher" (1963) as Marty
 Bonanza in the episode "The Hayburner" (1963) as Enos Milford
 Bonanza in the episode "Old Sheba" (1964) as Angus Tweedy
 The Twilight Zone in the episode "What's in the Box?" (1964) as Joe Britt
 My Three Sons (215 episodes, 1965–1972) as Uncle Charley O'Casey
 McMillan and Wife [Two Dollars on Trouble to Win] S2/Ep07 (1973) as Uncle Cyrus

Radio appearances

References

External links

 
 
 

1892 births
1983 deaths
American male film actors
American male silent film actors
American male television actors
American male stage actors
Deaths from cancer in California
Deaths from prostate cancer
Deaths from pneumonia in California
Male actors from Saint Paul, Minnesota
Military personnel from Minnesota
People from Bergen County, New Jersey
Vaudeville performers
20th-century American male actors
Burials at Forest Lawn Memorial Park (Glendale)
United States Army personnel of World War I
Metro-Goldwyn-Mayer contract players
Paramount Pictures contract players